Tomás "Tommy" Freeman is an Irish Gaelic footballer from Magheracloone, County Monaghan. He plays at senior level for the Monaghan county team. He received an All Star Award in 2007. Freeman plays his club football for Magheracloone Mitchells.

Personal life
Freeman is a carpenter by profession. His brother Damien also played for Magheracloone and Monaghan.

Playing career

Inter-county
In 2005 Freeman helped Monaghan win the National League Division 2 title. He scored 2–03 against Meath in the final. He also won an Irish News Ulster All-Star award for his performances that year.

In 2007 Freeman helped Monaghan reach the Ulster Senior Football Championship final, where they lost by two points to Tyrone (1-15 to 1-13). Freeman was top scorer in that year's Ulster Championship a total of 0-12. Monaghan however went on to reach the All-Ireland Championship quarter-final, where they met reigning champions Kerry. He cut his thumb in a work-related accident a few days before the match and he had to get a cast on, which was only removed two days before the match. He did however play in the game and scored 1-02, which Kerry won 1–12 to 11. Freeman finished the Championship with 4-22, the second highest scorer behind Cork's James Masters. He was awarded an All Star award for his performances that year and also named Irish News Ulster Player of the year.

Freeman was very much a key player once again in 2008 for Monaghan. They were not as successful as the year before but Tommy still made many highly rated performances. Monaghan were often criticised for their heavy dependence on him and teammate Paul Finlay. This was a disappointing year as they once again went out to Kerry in the All-Ireland qualifiers after a great display against Derry in the previous round. He received an Ulster All-Star in 2008.

In 2009 Monaghan made it to the division 2 league final in which they played Cork. Freeman was still Monaghan's best player in this year but received a 2 match ban for an incident where he tried to hit a Derry player in the Ulster Quarter Final. Freeman was sorely missed in their next 2 games against Armagh and Derry, although Monaghan made a fine display to beat 'The Orchard County' on a score of 0–13 to 012 after extra time but Banty's army fell short with Tommy still serving his 2 match ban during the encounter with 'The Oak Leaf County'.

Freeman's tireless dedication to the Monaghan cause was finally rewarded in 2013 when he and the Monaghan team beat Donegal in the final of the Ulster Senior Football Championship to win the trophy. The victory ended a 25-year wait for glory in the competition.

International Rules
Freeman has represented Ireland in the International Rules Series.

Province
Freeman has played for Ulster in the Railway Cup. He has won the competition on ? occasions with the province, including in 2007 where he scored 1–01 in the final against Munster.

References

External links
 cul4kidz profile

Year of birth missing (living people)
Living people
Irish carpenters
Gaelic football forwards
Irish international rules football players
Magheracloone Mitchells Gaelic footballers
Monaghan inter-county Gaelic footballers